The Battle of Karnal (24 February 1739), was a decisive victory for Nader Shah, the founder of the Afsharid dynasty of Iran, during his invasion of India. Nader's forces defeated the army of Muhammad Shah within three hours, paving the way for the Iranian sack of Delhi. The engagement is considered the crowning jewel in Nader's military career as well as a tactical masterpiece.

The battle was the culminating point of Nader Shah's invasion of the Mughal Empire. After his conquest of eastern Afghanistan and invasion via Kabul and Peshawar, Nader led his forces south towards the Mughal capital. At Delhi Muhammad Shah gathered an extremely large force with which he marched north before his cumbersome army ground to a halt at Karnal. Nader gave battle and won a crushing victory. In the negotiations following the catastrophic defeat, Muhammad Shah agreed to pay a large indemnity in exchange for maintaining his imperium over his lands. Nader, however, forced the Mughal emperor to submit utterly and marched him to his capital, Delhi, where the Mughal treasury was plundered. An uprising against Nader's soldiers by Delhi's citizens ended in a bloody massacre in which the entire city was sacked and looted. The enormous plunder gained in Delhi caused Nader to issue an imperial decree removing all taxes for a total of three years. The Persian army soon departed and left behind 30,000 dead. Muhammad Shah was also forced to concede all his lands west of the Indus, which were annexed by Nader Shah.

As a result of the overwhelming defeat of the Mughal Empire at Karnal, the already-declining Mughal dynasty was critically weakened to such an extent as to hasten its demise. According to Axworthy, it is also possible that without the ruinous effects of Nader's invasion of India, European colonial takeover of the Indian subcontinent would have come in a different form or perhaps not at all.

Nader's casus belli
A popular destination for the plethora of Afghan mercenaries and warlords who were defeated in Nader's numerous campaigns against the various polities in Afghanistan was the northern border areas of the Mughal Empire. Nader had sent several requests to the local governors and statesmen of northern India requesting that these fugitives be captured and handed over to him. In the aftermath of his conquest of Afghanistan, Nader was seeking a pretext to invade the Mughal Empire. Naturally, he seized upon that opportunity to mask his invasion in the form of a hunt for the Afghan warriors who had found asylum in the rugged terrain of the northern Mughal realm.

It is also noteworthy that Nader had been in contact with one of the main Mughal ministers, Nizam-ul-Mulk, who some at the time accused of treachery against the Mughal emperor. It is possible that Nizam-ul-Mulk provoked Nader's invasion of the Mughal Empire, but that is an implausible conjecture.

Whether or not the Mughal Empire could have defused the situation diplomatically is still a matter of discussion. The ability of the Mughal state to find and imprison Afghan fugitives in its border regions is a seriously doubtful issue, as is anyway the actual number of fugitives who escaped to these regions. It is very possible that they were an insubstantial number. Nader Shah's intention to invade Mughal India would have continued, regardless of whether or not the Mughal authorities had granted his request to seek out and handing over fugitives. It is quite probable that Nader Shah used the demand for fugitives, which was met in full, as a pretext to invade and plunder.

Nader's entry into the Mughal Empire
As Nader moved into the Mughal territories, he was accompanied by his Georgian subject and future king of eastern Georgia, Erekle II, who led a Georgian contingent in the Imperial Persian army. Hearing of Nader Shah's approach from Qandahar, the governor of Peshawar and Kabul raised an army of 20,000 men, mostly of Afghan mercenaries drawn from the tribes of eastern Afghanistan to check the Persian advance. The position that had been chosen to resist the Persian army could scarcely have been better selected, as through the narrow Khyber Pass, only a small column of men could hope to march and any deployment into fighting formations would be an impossibility. Nader, convinced of the futility of a head-on struggle, instead opted for an alternative approach. A local guide informed him of a difficult yet traversable pass running parallel to that of Khyber: the Pass of Chatchoobi.

Setting out on 26 November from near Jalal Abad, the Persian army arrived at Barikab (33 kilometres from the Kheibar pass) where Nader divided his army, leaving Morteza Mirza behind with the bulk of the forces at his disposal and sending forth 12,000 men to the Khyber Pass under Nasrollah Qoli while he gathered 10,000 chosen light cavalry under his direct command. Beginning an epic flank-march of over 80 kilometres through some of the most unnavigable terrain in Asia Nader reached Ali-Masjed whence the 10,000 curved their route of march northwards and onto the eastern end of the Kheibar pass.

The abrupt emergence of a strong body of cavalry in their rear caught the governor's forces in a difficult position, though they managed to resist for a short while before Nader's light cavalry routed them entirely. Thus, the path to the north-lands of the Mughal Empire was cleared and the main body of the Imperial Persian army could march into the Mughal interior.

On 16 November 1739, Nader marched his advance guard out of Peshawar heading south towards Sindh river in Punjab. Upon crossing the river the Persian army fell upon the defenceless countryside on its way to Lahor pillaging and burning as they went. The governor of Lahor began augmenting his battlements in the hope of resistance. Nader hastened his advance and attacked from an unexpected direction with such force that after a mere day had passed, the governor surrendered to the Shah's will. The gift of two million rupees to the Shah secured the governor in his position as ruler of Lahor.

Muhammad Shah gathers a large force
The news of the series of conquests by Nader's invading army had caused much consternation at the Mughal court of Muhammad Shah residing in Delhi. Nizam-ul-Mulk was summoned to the Emperor's presence and many summons were sent out across northern India for contribution of military forces. 13 December saw the Mughal army march out of Delhi to confront the invading forces to the north. The enormity of its size was such that the length of the column was 25 kilometres and the width was 3 kilometres. Muhammad Shah himself joined this army. Due to the cumbersome size of the Mughal army, Muhammad Shah could not take his forces any further than Karnal, approximately 120 kilometres north of Delhi.

In total, Muhammad Shah commanded a war-camp of 300,000 troops including the non-combatants equipped with 3,000 guns along with 2,000 war elephants. Out these the forces deployed on the field were numbered at 75,000. Despite the large numbers at the Mughal's disposal they suffered from obsolescent war material and antiquated tactical systems. Almost all of the guns in the army were far too large in calibre to be considered field artillery as they were practically impossible to manoeuvre during battle and took such a long time to reload that they would have minimal effect even in cases of correct utilisation. In contrast, most of Nader's artillery was lighter and much more manoeuvrable than their Mughal counterparts, as well as the zamburaks which provided extra mobile fire power. In contrast to the Mughal army's infantry, all of the 20,000 Persian musketeers (jazyarechi) were uniformed, drilled and homogeneously organised. Although the 50,000 cavalry contingent in the Mughal army was of excellent quality, there was nothing to suggest a common and cohesive underlying military structure set out for their deployment and use. The Persian cavalry was composed of two parts. The troops of the state which were trained and drilled via a uniform system, and the auxiliary troops which were recruited into the Imperial army after the conquest of their homeland.

Nader sent out a raiding party of 6,000 Kurdish riders with the objective of gathering intelligence and bringing back prisoners for the purposes of interrogation. The raiding party ambushed a contingent of the Mughal artillery and made away with a number of prisoners which they carried back to camp. Leaving the main body of his forces under the command of his son, Morteza Mirza, Nader gathered a smaller force and advanced on an old fortress, Azimabad, a mere 32 kilometres from Karnal. Azimabad was easily subdued after the Persian guns had been brought up against its fortifications.

Here Nader met with the leader of the 6,000 strong scouting division of Kurds. He was informed on the geography of the surroundings of Karnal and the strength of the Mughal camp's division. He decided to quietly position his forces far east of the Mughal camp and to draw Muhammad Shah into battle at a place of his choosing.

Battle

Dispositions and deployments
On 23 February, the Persian army broke camp and entered the valley between the Alimardan and the Jamna Rivers. Encamping north of the village of Kanjpura, Nader rode out to inspect the enemy's position himself. Upon returning to camp, Nader summoned all the officers in the army for a speech. Later in the day, news reached Nader of a large contingent of Mughals marching through Panipat with the purpose of joining Muhammad Shah's army. The man leading this contingent was a confidant of Muhammad Shah and high-ranking statesman of the Mughal Empire, Sa'adat Khan. Nader began devising a stratagem based around using Sa'adat Khan's approach to lure the main Mughal army across Alimardan river and into the valley before Kanjpura village where he intended to give battle from an advantageous position. The long-awaited Sa'adat Khan entered the Mughal encampment to much jubilation; however, the bulk of his column (some twenty or thirty thousand soldiers) was still en route.

On the morning of 24 February, Nader divided his men into three main bodies. The centre of the army was positioned just north of the village of Kanjpura facing west and commanded by Nader's son, Morteza Mirza (who would later be renamed Nassrollah Qoli in honour of his achievements in the coming battle), with a retinue of senior advisers at his disposal. To Morteza Qoli's north, Tahmasp Khan Jalayer commanded the right flank of the army, and to the south, joint command of the left was given to Fath-Ali Khan Kiani and Lotf-Ali Khan Afshar.

At this juncture, news was brought to Sa'adat Khan that the rearguard of his column had come under attack and the baggage had been captured and carried off by the enemy. Although Sa'adat Khan had managed to reach the Mughal camp late the previous night, a large portion of his forces, some twenty or thirty thousand men, were still en route at the time of his arrival. Without consulting or convening either Muhammad Shah or other commanders, Sa'adat Khan immediately mounted his war elephant and rode out to the reported site of the skirmish. He was accompanied by 2,000 cavalry and infantry in addition to the numerous artillery units which trailed behind him. More of his men would join him soon after his departure from camp. Sa'adat Khan engaged the isolated Persian cavalry units deployed in the vicinity of the area, which made a show of resistance before feigning a rout towards the east. Sending urgent reports back to camp of the upper hand he had gained, Sa'adat Khan pleaded for reinforcements in order to complete the victory.

As the reports reached the Mughal high command, disagreement arose as to whether these calls for reinforcement ought to be answered. Muhammad Shah was eager to join Sa'adat Khan in the field, but his two chief advisers, Nizam-ul-Mulk and Khan Dowran, advised caution against rash decisions. A frustrated Muhammad Shah made insinuations regarding the martial character of Khan Dowran, to which he responded zealously by donning armour and mounting his war elephant in preparation for battle. Khan-i Dauran declared that it was not the Indian style to abandon a friend, even if he was imprudent. The initial total of men leaving the Mughal camp alongside Khan Dowran amounted to no more than 8,000–9,000 men, mostly cavalry and some musket-bearing infantry. A steady stream of reinforcements left the Mughal encampment to cross the Alimardan river and join battle throughout the day, but there was no effort to bring these large numbers under a unified deployment east of the Alimardan river in support of Mughal units already engaged. Instead, the Mughals at the front would receive a continuous line of reinforcements with no grand tactical plan to help direct them.

Nader divides the Mughals on the centre and left wing
As Nader observed the advance of Sa'adat Khan in the direction of the Persian centre, he ordered that the zamburaks be taken forth so as to maximise fire power in the initial exchange. Personally commanding a chosen force of 1,000 cavalry drawn from the ranks of the  Afshar clan, he deployed three elite units of cavalry, armed with Jazāyerchi muskets, in the vicinity of Kanjpura village. These units (each a thousand strong) were also supported by Nader's deployment of zamburaks. Sending out two units of his elite Jazāyerchi on mounts with the purpose of diverting the Mughal advance onto the Persian centre, Nader then sent out another unit to set Khan Dowran on a divergent path and eventually lure him towards the army's left wing which was waiting in ambush around Kanjpura.

Although Sa'adat Khan in fact halted his advance temporarily, in anticipation of Khan Dowran's reinforcements, due to Nader's brilliant diversionary tactics Khan Dowran was led away from Sa'adat Khan's forces and Sa'adat Khan himself was teased into resuming his advance east without consolidating with upcoming reinforcements. Nizam-ul-Mulk began forming up his men behind the Alimardan river in a lethargic attempt at moving up to support the leading elements of the army.

The Persian centre was eagerly awaiting the arrival of Sa'adat Khan's men with loaded muskets and guns. As the Mughals came into musketry range, the screening force of mounted troops fell away to reveal a line of jazayerchi with levelled muskets. A uniform volley was fired into the upcoming enemy. A great testament to the bravery of Sa'adat Khan's men, the Mughals braced and took the punishing fire from the Persian line. They were even able to close with the centre and a general melee ensued, bringing great pressure on the Persian centre.

Ambush at Kanjpura

Further to the south, where the Persian left flank was positioned at Kanjpura, Khan Dowran played right into Nader's hands as his pursuit suddenly marched right into a bloody ambush. The sudden appearance of Persian troops from the environs of Kanjpura paralysed the Mughals. The sheer volume of fire from the Jazāyerchi and zamburaks raked incredible destruction on the unfortunate Mughal soldiers caught in the bewildering mayhem Nader had concocted.

Nader observed the massacre from behind the main line of Jazāyerchi as they fired volley after volley into the reeling enemy before them. The cavalry of Khan Dowran, consisting of Indian Muslims, looked down on fighting with muskets with contempt, which was a talent of Hindu infantrymen in India. They prided themselves on sword-play and fancy-riding, while musketeers were not given importance in the Mughal military compared to Iran. The heavy bullets of the Jazāyer muskets easily penetrated the armour of the war elephants and many nobles were killed and captured amongst the Mughals. Khan Dowran himself was struck; badly injured, he fell from his elephant as his own blood splattered over him, prompting his remaining retainers to scramble to his aid.

Tahmasp Khan Jalayer, in command of the Persian right, was not engaged until this phase in the battle and began wrapping his forces around the left flank of Sa'adat Khan's men from the north. After two hours of intense fighting in the centre, Sa'adat Khan's war elephant became entangled with another and in the frenzy a Persian soldier climbed the side of the Khan's beast and implored him to surrender. Being caught in an impossible set of circumstances Sa'adat Khan decided to lay down his arms. Many other Mughal soldiers followed suit while others broke and fled west. With the cream of the enemy army utterly decimated and the rest fleeing across the Alimardan river the Persians engaged in an organised pursuit with Nader halting his forces just out of range of the Mughal battle line drawn up behind the river. Unwilling to engage the Mughals on disadvantageous ground Nader re-established his lines in the valley to the east. Muhammad Shah urged the Nizam to help Khan Dowran, but the Nizam moved no further and ignored all pleas for action. The Nizam had held a grudge with the general Khan Dowran, who had jeered at him in the past, saying, "See how the Deccan monkey dances".

Nader later sent troops around the periphery of the Mughal encampment to form a blockade by cutting the logistical lines leading into Muhammad Shah's camp. The news of Sa'adat Khan's capture and the rumoured death of Khan Dowran along with so many other high ranking Mughal officers caused a collapse in the morale of the army. The loss of hope led to mutiny in some cases and groups of soldiers began plundering the camp.

Losses and consequences

The Mughals suffered far heavier casualties than the Persians. Exact figures are uncertain as accounts of that period were prone to bombast. Various contemporary commentators estimated Mughal casualties being up to 30,000 men slain with most agreeing on a figure of around 20,000 and with Axworthy giving an estimate of roughly 10,000 Mughal soldiers killed. Nader himself claimed that his army slew 20,000 and imprisoned "many more". The number of Mughal officers slain amounted to a staggering 400. Though as a proportion of the entire Mughal army the actual casualties suffered were not excessive, this masks the fact that the casualties constituted the very best of the Mughal army, including an overwhelming number of its leaders.

The Mughals had been defeated in part due to their outdated cannons. In addition, Indian elephants were an easy target for Persian artillery and Persian troops were more skilled with a musket.

The nature of the casualties caused great despair amongst the remaining Mughals who as a consequence of the crushing defeat were unable to maintain their discipline. Soon after morale collapsed, the soldiers looted their own camp, many deserted and any will to fight again evaporated. One of the most painful losses was that of Khan Dowran. He was brought back badly wounded and his loyal retainers could not even find a place for him to rest his head. Nizam-ul-Mulk, due to a long-standing enmity, came to Khan Dowran's side as he was dying in order to ridicule him before his death. The Khan died that evening surrounded by his few surviving followers.

Recent scholarship gives an estimate of the total Persian casualties at a mere 1,100 including 400 killed and 700 wounded. This number comprised such a small fraction of the Persian army as to be negligible.

Sa'adat Khan was taken to Nader that very evening. The Khan advised the Shah to call upon Nizam-ul-Mulk as he was the "key to the Empire". Soon afterward, Nizam-ul-Mulk and a following of other Mughal negotiators arrived at Nader's camp.

Although the meeting was initially tense, with the Mughal plenipotentiaries arriving with armour instead of plain clothing, Nader soon requested that he and Nizam-ul-Mulk be left alone to discuss matters more freely. Once alone with the Shah, Nizam-ul-Mulk humbly claimed that his life was entirely at his mercy. Nader impressed upon him the importance of Muhammad Shah agreeing to pay an indemnity to the Persian crown. Having convinced Nizam-ul-Mulk to request the Mughal Emperor's personal presence in the Persian camp, Nader sent him away.

26 February saw the Mughal Emperor travel to meet with his Persian counterpart amongst much pomp and circumstance. Nader paid Muhammad Shah the respect worthy of an Emperor and conversed with him in Turkic. After the conclusion of the negotiations the Mughal party returned to their encampment west of Alimardan river.

A sharp dispute arose regarding who would replace Khan Dowran in his office. Muhammad Shah interceded on Nizam-ul-Mulk's behalf which enraged many other notables, chief amongst them Sa'adat Khan. It is claimed that Sa'adat Khan entered into secret correspondence with Nader and incited the Shah to march to Delhi in order to extract a much larger indemnity from Muhammad Shah.

Mughal submission and sacking of Delhi

In early March, Nader summoned Nizam-ul-Mulk once again and unilaterally declared the previous agreements to be null and void. Nizam-ul-Mulk protested but was forced to write Muhammad Shah to implore him to once again travel to the Persian camp. Muhammad Shah complied and thereafter permanently remained in Nader's presence (and custody). In an act of mercy, Nader allowed the Mughal soldiers still in their camp to leave with their mounts and livestock, and he also gave an advance payment to all of his own soldiers, in addition to the Persian camp followers. Tahmasp Khan Jalayer, one of Nader's most dependable lieutenants, was given the task of marching ahead in the company of Sa'adat Khan on the route to Delhi.

Persian occupation of Delhi
Nader entered Delhi with Mohammed Shah as his vassal on 20 March 1739. The person of the Shah was accompanied by 20,000 Savaran-e Saltanati (royal guard), and 100 war elephants mounted by his Jazāyerchi. As the conqueror of Delhi entered, the city's fortification fired their guns in salute. The Persians received a sumptuous welcome in Muhammad Shah's palace. Sa'adat Khan was tasked by Nader to collect taxes from the citizens of Delhi and did his best to please the Shah in an attempt to ingratiate himself with his obsequious behaviour. However, when Sa'adat Khan sought an audience with Nader, the Shah chastised him harshly for not collecting the taxes with satisfactory speed. After Sa'adat Khan's humiliating defeat at Karnal, his open disloyalty to his emperor in the aftermath, his ignominious failure to curry favour with the person he believed was his new patron, forced to rob his own people of their wealth for a foreign invading host, he became burdened to such an extent that he died in Delhi no more than just a few days after his arrival in that city.

Nader Shah was intent on establishing control through his new vassal, Muhammad Shah, and made clear his intent to keep him enthroned. As such, strict military discipline was maintained and a decree made any harassment of civilians punishable by mutilation. Nader found the Mughal aristocracy soft and weak. In an encounter with a Mughal minister, Nader enquired as to how many women he had in his harem, the minister answered 850. Nader quipped that he would add another 150 slave girls in order to promote him to the rank of minbashi (commander of a thousand). On 21 March Nader celebrated Nowruz, the Persian new year, and many generals and officers were given gifts and promotions.

Mughal Uprising and sack of Delhi

Rumours began spreading amongst the populace of Delhi that a gratuitous levy was imminent. There were also tales of Muhammad Shah seizing Nader and or having him killed one way or another. When a rumour broke out that Nader himself had been assassinated, a posse of Delhi citizens gathered around a granary as a group of Persian soldiers had been sent to negotiate prices, and the posse attacked and killed five Persian soldiers. The event sparked an uprising, and bands of civilians swept through the city and targeted isolated Persian soldiers in succession. When news was taken to Nader, he was dismissive, believing his soldiers were seeking out a pretext to ransack the city. But after successive reports of lynchings, Nader sent one of his retainers to verify these claims. He sent another of his inner circle also, but both were killed by the baying crowds. Nader sent out a fowj (a thousand-strong unit) but ordered them to engage only those involved in the violence.

The uprising in Delhi took on greater momentum as the reinforcing detachments sent by Nader to restore order came under fire from muskets and arrows. Numerous isolated contingents from the Persian army were caught holed up in scattered complexes throughout the city that night. On the morning of 22 March, Nader rode out from the palace in which he had quartered during the night and headed towards the Rowshan O-Dowleh mosque. En route, a musket was fired from a nearby building, narrowly missing Nader and instead killing one of his generals. Once atop the roof of the mosque, Nader ordered his men to enter into all districts in which Persian soldiers had been killed and to leave not a single survivor. He raised his sword, signifying the start of a massacre.

Three thousand soldiers marched out of the mosque's courtyard and began a gruesome and blood-curdling mass killing. Nader Shah "sat with sword in hand, wearing a solemn face steeped in melancholy and lost in deep thought. No man dared break the silence." Smoke rose above the city with ceaseless sounds of suffering and pleading echoing throughout. There was sparse resistance and most people were killed with no fighting chance. Many men were arrested and taken to the river Yamuna where they were all beheaded in cold blood. The soldiers entered houses and killed all the inhabitants, plundered all the riches they found and then set fire to what remained. The murder and rapine was such that many men chose to kill both themselves and their families instead of being subjected and slaughtered by the Persian soldiery.

Two of the most important Mughal nobles who were involved in instigating the uprising were Seyed Niaz Khan and Shahnawaz Khan. Niaz Khan and a small band of followers took the small group of Persian soldiers posted outside his residence for his protection by surprise and killed all of them. He next joined up with Shahnawaz Khan and attacked the stables in which Nader Shah had stored all the captured Indian war elephants. The stables were soon overrun and the two even managed to escape the city during the cacophony of violence with the elephants. They took refuge in a fort near the city. The Persian soldiers, however, sought them out and broke into the fort, taking Niaz Khan and Shahnawaz Khan prisoner with their few hundred followers. All of them were taken to Nader near the mosque. All of them were beheaded by Nader's command on the spot. The only group of prisoners Nader released were women.

The slaughter, which had begun late in the evening the day before, continued until dawn the next day, when Nader sent out his officers and messengers proclaiming the end of the massacre. The swiftness of the Persian army's cessation of hostility was remarkable and many contemporary commentators stated their admiration for the strict discipline of Nader's army. Although the killing lasted only a few hours, the number of dead was immense. Some 30,000 men, women and children perished at the hands of the Persian soldiers. After the conclusion of this most unfortunate episode in Delhi's history, Nader's officials began collecting taxes and some were also sent out to Delhi's environs to do the same. Not even Muhammad Shah's ministers were safe, and one in particular was tortured and his wealth seized by force of arms.

Nader sent forth 1,000 cavalrymen to each district of the city to ensure the collection of taxes. But perhaps the greatest riches were plundered from the treasuries of the Mughal dynasty's capital. The Peacock Throne was also taken away by the Persian army, and thereafter served as a symbol of Persian imperial might. Among a trove of other fabulous jewels, Nader also gained the Koh-i-Noor ("Mountain of Light") and Darya-ye Noor ("Sea of Light") diamonds. It is estimated that the total worth of the treasures plundered came to perhaps 700 million rupees. This was roughly the equivalent to £90 million sterling at the time, or £8.2 billion sterling in the early 21st century.

The Mughal Emperor was forced to sign a number of treaties, which brought further ruin to his realm. All lands west of the Indus were ceded to the Persian Empire. Nader also sought to establish marital bonds between the two dynasties and arranged marriages for his sons and generals as well as himself. Having gained all the riches he desired, Nader made preparations for his departure.

Persian troops left Delhi at the beginning of May 1739, also taking with them thousands of elephants, horses, and camels, all loaded with the booty they had collected. The plunder seized from India was so rich that Nader stopped taxation in Persia for a period of three years following his return. On Nader's return to Iran, Sikhs fell upon Nader's army and seized a large amount of booty and freed the slaves in captivity.

The Persian army marched north toward the Hindu Kush. An audience of governors was called by Nader from his newly acquired lands in northern India. All came bearing gifts and protestations of their loyalty to their new overlord except one. Khodayar Khan, governor of Sindh, had bargained on Nader being content with his enormous plunder and already considerable territorial acquisitions, and so he deemed himself safe from Nader. Khodayar Khan believed that Nader would not traverse the punishingly rugged terrain of the Hindu Kush mountains so late into the campaigning season. He was mistaken.

The Maathir-ul-Umara states that Khudayar Khan answered:
"We from the time of our forefathers were the servants of the King of India, if we had shown an inclination for you, you would not have believed us."

Historic ramifications
Nader Shah's victory against the crumbling Mughal Empire in the East meant that he could afford to turn to the West and face Persia's archrivals, the Ottomans, once again. The Ottoman Sultan Mahmud I initiated the Ottoman–Persian War (1743–1746) in which Muhammad Shah closely co-operated with the Ottomans, as well as after, until his death in 1748. Nader's Indian campaign alerted the British East India Company to the extreme weakness of the Mughal Empire and the possibility of expanding British imperialism to fill the power vacuum.

As a result of the defeat of the Mughal Empire at Karnal, the already-declining Mughal dynasty was critically weakened to such an extent as to hasten its demise. According to Axworthy, it is also possible that without the ruinous effects of Nader's invasion of India, the European colonial takeover of the Indian subcontinent would have come in a different form or perhaps not at all, which would have fundamentally changed the history of the Indian Subcontinent.

See also
Military of the Afsharid dynasty of Persia
Mughal dynasty
Afsharid dynasty
Battle of Khyber Pass
Iranian Crown Jewels
Nadir Shah's invasion of India
Battle of Delhi (1737)
Attack on Nadir Shah (1739)

References

Bibliography
 
 Cust, Edward, Annals of the wars of the eighteenth century, Gilbert & Rivington Printers: London, 1862.
 Dupuy, R. Ernest and Trevor N. Dupuy, The Harper Encyclopedia of Military History, 4th Ed., HarperCollinsPublishers, 1993.
 Mohammad Kazem Marvi Yazdi, Rare views of the world  3 vols., Ed Amin Riahi, Tehran, Third Edition, 1374

External links
Nadir Shah's invasion in India
Battle of Karnal 1739 – History of Haryana

Conflicts in 1739
Karnal 1739
Karnal 1739
Karnal
Karnal
1739 in India
History of Haryana
Campaigns of Nader Shah